The Impossible Whopper is a veggie burger sold by Burger King. The Impossible Whopper is a variant of the Whopper with a meat substitute burger patty provided by Impossible Foods.

Product description 
The Impossible Whopper is made with a meat alternative burger patty from Impossible Foods, topped with tomatoes, lettuce, mayonnaise, ketchup, pickles, and onions. It can be ordered with cheese. The Impossible Whopper is prepared with mayonnaise and on the same grill as all other burgers. As such, the Impossible Whopper is not vegetarian or vegan unless customers modify the toppings and ask for it to be prepared in an oven and not on the grill.

References 

Burger King foods
Meat substitutes